Jim Polito is a radio talk show host for WTAG in Worcester, Massachusetts (AM 580 and FM 94.9).

Polito graduated from Saint John's High School in Shrewsbury, Massachusetts and Worcester State College where he majored in Urban Studies with a concentration in Communications.

His past work includes serving as Chief Investigative Reporter for WGGB, the ABC television network affiliate in Springfield, Massachusetts where he was recognized with several Associated Press Awards, two for his coverage of the disappearance of Warren lifeguard Molly Bish. Polito was the first reporter from western Massachusetts to report live from Ground Zero in New York on 9/11 for which he received a 2002 Associated Press Award.

Polito was fired from WGGB-TV in 2008 amid reports of harassment. "Gormally ended the letter with a warning: "[Y]ou are hereby given notice that the next meritorious complaint from a co-worker accusing you of harassment or bullying or inappropriate behavior will result in your immediate termination."

Polito contends that he never harassed or threatened Pratt. When he'd run into her in the station parking lot, he said she was heading to a meeting with Tom Bevacqua, Local 19's president and Channel 40's former chief meteorologist, who was holding office hours at a restaurant across the street. Polito believed Pratt had been discussing union matters with Gormally while union officials had been trying without much luck to hammer out a new contract with the owner. Polito wrote in his rebuttal that he asked her, "Could you do me a favor and stop trying to bargain for the Union with John Gormally?”

http://www.valleyadvocate.com/article.cfm?aid=5721

Polito left WFXT Fox-25 in 2014 to return to WTAG.

References

External links
 WTAG biography
 http://www.masslive.com/news/index.ssf/2007/12/polito_out_at_abc40.html

American radio personalities
Living people
Year of birth missing (living people)
Worcester State University alumni